Women of the Manchu Hešeri clan referred to as Lady Hešeri include: 

 Empress Xiaochengren (1654 – 1674), of the Manchu Plain Yellow Banner, a consort of the Kangxi Emperor.
 Imperial Noble Consort Xianzhe (1856 – 1932), of the Manchu Bordered Blue Banner, a consort of the Tongzhi Emperor

See also
 Hešeri